The Party is a 1969 Australian TV play. It was made by the ABC in Melbourne under the direction of Chris Muir.

It was written for the ABC by the head of Victorian religious broadcasts, John Nicholson. It aired in Melbourne and Sydney on 12 October 1969. It ran for 45 minutes.

Plot
An Everyman has a dinner party where the guests include Martin Luter, Cardinal Manning, Francis of Assissi and Erasmus.

Cast
Brian James as the host
Brian Moll as Martin Luther
Heinrich Hesse as the French priest
Michael Howley as Cardinal Manning
John Rickard as Francis of Assissi
Norman Kaye as Erasmus

References

1960s Australian television plays
1969 television plays